Joy of Fatherhood is a 2014 German comedy film directed by Matthias Schweighöfer.

Cast 
 Matthias Schweighöfer - Felix
 Isabell Polak - Maren
 Friedrich Mücke - Henne
 Tom Beck - Ralph
  - Jessie
  - Leonie
  - Tom
  - Norbert
 Katharina Schüttler - Betti
  - Sybille
 Tim Sander - Frederic Sattelmeyer
 Detlev Buck - Dr. Parisius
 Susan Hoecke - Kara

References

External links 

2014 comedy films
German comedy films
Films directed by Matthias Schweighöfer
Films scored by Martin Todsharow
2010s German films
2010s German-language films